Big Lake (Dena'ina: K'enaka Bena)is a census-designated place (CDP) in Matanuska-Susitna Borough, Alaska, United States. It is part of the Anchorage, Alaska Metropolitan Statistical Area.  The population was 3,833 at the 2020 census, up from 3,350 in 2010.

Geography
Big Lake is located at  (61.537449, -149.891104).

Climate

Big Lake, Alaska experiences an average of 51.4 inches of snowfall per year, 109 precipitation days, 131 sunny days, and an average annual wind speed of 8.18 MPH.

Parks
The area is home to three Alaska State Parks facilities. Big Lake North State Recreation Site is a  park with a large campground, picnic areas, boat launch, and jetski rentals. Big Lake South State Recreation Site has a smaller campground, picnic sites, and boat launch. Winter activities in both parks include cross country skiing, ice fishing, and dog mushing.

The Rocky Lake State Recreation Site is a  park with a  campground, picnic areas, and lake access.

Demographics
As of the 2010 census, Big Lake had a population of 3,350. As of the 2017 American Community Survey, it was estimated to have 3,136 residents, of whom 53.2% were male, 46.8% were female, 82.8% were white, 5.2% were Native American or Alaska Native, 0.7% were Asian, and 11.3% were two or more races. 5.4% were Hispanic or Latino of any race.

Big Lake

Big Lake first appeared on the 1960 U.S. Census as an unincorporated village. It was made a census-designated place (CDP) in 1980.

As of the census of 2000, there were 2,635 people, 971 households, and 647 families residing in the CDP.  The population density was 20.0 people per square mile (7.7/km2).  There were 2,122 housing units at an average density of 16.1/sq mi (6.2/km2).  The racial makeup of the CDP was 87.13% White, 0.34% Black or African American, 7.32% Native American, 0.27% Asian, 0.04% Pacific Islander, 0.87% from other races, and 4.02% from two or more races.  1.97% of the population were Hispanic or Latino of any race.

There were 971 households, out of which 31.9% had children under the age of 18 living with them, 53.1% were married couples living together, 8.7% had a female householder with no husband present, and 33.3% were non-families. 24.1% of all households were made up of individuals, and 4.2% had someone living alone who was 65 years of age or older.  The average household size was 2.60 and the average family size was 3.10.

In the CDP, the population was spread out, with 27.5% under the age of 18, 6.8% from 18 to 24, 32.3% from 25 to 44, 26.0% from 45 to 64, and 7.4% who were 65 years of age or older.  The median age was 38 years. For every 100 females, there were 118.7 males.  For every 100 females age 18 and over, there were 125.8 males.

The median income for a household in the CDP was $43,382, and the median income for a family was $47,542. Males had a median income of $40,000 versus $30,139 for females. The per capita income for the CDP was $19,285.  About 9.8% of families and 14.6% of the population were below the poverty line, including 20.7% of those under age 18 and 1.0% of those age 65 or over.

Former City of Long Island (1965-1975)

Within Big Lake is the former short-lived incorporated city of Long Island, which existed from 1965-1975 and had just 7 residents on the 1970 census. This is not to be confused with the former logging camp of Long Island.

References

Census-designated places in Matanuska-Susitna Borough, Alaska
Census-designated places in Alaska
Anchorage metropolitan area